Artemisia suksdorfii is a North American species of sagebrush in the sunflower family. It is known by the common names coastal mugwort, coastal wormwood, and Suksdorf sagewort.  It is native to coastal regions from British Columbia, Washington, Oregon, and northern California as far south as Sonoma County, with isolated populations on Santa Catalina Island in Los Angeles County.

Artemisia suksdorfii grows in coastal drainages and other habitat near the ocean. This is a rhizomatous perennial herb producing many erect stems one half to two meters in height. The unbranched stems are brownish and have woody bases. The leaves are narrow and lobed, green and hairless on top and white and woolly underneath. The inflorescence is generally spike-like, up to 30 centimeters long and a few wide. It contains many clusters of small flower heads with shiny yellow-green phyllaries and yellow disc and pistillate florets. The fruit is a tiny achene less than a millimeter long.

The species is named for German-American botanist Wilhelm Nikolaus Suksdorf (1850-1932).

References

External links

Jepson Manual eFlora (TJM2) treatment of Artemisia suksdorfii
UC Photos gallery: Artemisia suksdorfii 
Turner Photographics, Wildflowers of the Pacific Northwest 
Paul Slichter, Mugworts, Sageworts and Wormwoods: The Genus Artemisia West of the Cascade Mountains of Oregon and Washington, Suksdorf's Sagewort, Coastal Mugwort, Coastal Wormwood, Artemisia suksdorfii 
Pollen Library

suksdorfii
Flora of British Columbia
Flora of California
Flora of Oregon
Flora of Washington (state)
Natural history of the Channel Islands of California
Plants described in 1841
Flora without expected TNC conservation status